The Western Maryland K-2 was a class of 9 4-6-2 "Pacific" type steam locomotives built by the Baldwin Locomotive Works in 1912 and operated by the Western Maryland Railway until the early 1950s.

They pulled passenger trains until retirement and only one survives, No. 202.

History
When delivered to the Western Maryland, the locomotives were put in passenger service and were put to work on the newly completed Connellsville extension in 1912. They hauled passenger trains between Baltimore, MD, and Chicago, IL, including the first class Chicago Limited and Baltimore Limited. However, they were abandoned by 1917. Despite that, the locomotive would continue to haul passenger trains until the early 1950s. By 1938, all of the K-2s had their Baker valve gear replaced with Walschaert valve gear. In 1947, Nos. 201, 202, 204 and 206 were converted to burn oil to comply with smoke regulations in Baltimore. Following the conversion, the four K-2s would stay east of Cumberland for the rest of their career. Nos. 204 and 205 were eventually used in thaw service to thaw coal in hoppers before they were unloaded into ships at Port Covington, the WM port in Baltimore. Before retirement, No. 204 was considered the belle of the road. As the railroad was dieselising, retirement started in 1952 and by 1954, all of the K-2s have been retired.

Preservation
Only one K-2 has been preserved, No. 202. It was retired in 1952 and in 1953, the Western Maryland had decided to donate it to the children of Hagerstown and place it on display in Hagerstown City Park. Today, it is still on display there. On June 7, 1984, the locomotive was added to the National Register of Historic Places. It is one of only two surviving Western Maryland steam locomotives and the only surviving mainline WM steam locomotive.

Roster

References

Western Maryland Railway
4-6-2 locomotives
Baldwin locomotives
Passenger locomotives
Railway locomotives introduced in 1912
Standard gauge locomotives of the United States
Steam locomotives of the United States